The Women's Super50 Cup, officially the West Indies Cricket Board Women's Super50 Cup and previously the Women's Cricket Federation Championships, is a women's domestic one-day cricket competition organised by Cricket West Indies. The tournament began in 1975–76, as a first-class competition, but is now played as a 50-over competition, with six teams taking part: Barbados, Guyana, Jamaica, Leeward Islands, Trinidad and Tobago and Windward Islands. The competition runs alongside the Twenty20 Blaze.

The most successful side in the history of the competition are Trinidad and Tobago, with 13 wins. The current holders are Barbados, who won the 2022 competition after both the 2020 and 2021 tournaments were cancelled due to the COVID-19 pandemic.

History
The tournament began in 1975–76, as the Caribbean Women's Cricket Federation Championships, a two-day competition. Four teams competed: Barbados, Grenada, Jamaica and Trinidad and Tobago, but the winner of the competition is not recorded. Jamaica are the first recorded champions, winning the second tournament in 1977, which involved five teams, with Guyana joining the original four.

Over subsequent years, the tournament changed formats multiple times. In tournaments between 1989 and 1995, both a two-day round robin competition and a 50 over knockout competition were played. Following this, the competition permanently became a 50 over competition, but remained divided into two tournament formats, league and knockout, until 2007. In 2001 the tournament was renamed the West Indies Women's Cricket Federation Championships. From 2009 to 2014, teams played in two groups with a subsequent knockout stage. Following this, the tournament has always been one league stage, sometimes with a final for the top two in the group. In 2016–17 the tournament became the Regional Super50, and 2018–19 it became the Super50 Cup.

The teams competing in the tournament has varied over the years. Saint Lucia joined the competition in 1988, and competed until 2014. Dominica joined in 1996 and competed until 2002, and again from 2008 to 2014. Saint Vincent and the Grenadines competed from 2000 until 2014.

Barbados, Trinidad and Tobago, Jamaica and Guyana have competed in the competition through most of its history, whilst Grenada competed until 2014. In 2015, South Windward Islands and North Windward Islands competed, before being replaced the following season by Windward Islands and Leeward Islands. Finally, a team named North America competed in the competition in 2003.

Tournament results and winners are not fully recorded. However, Trinidad and Tobago are the most successful team based on recorded titles, with 13 wins. Jamaica have won 5 titles, Barbados 4, Saint Lucia 2 and 1 apiece for Grenada and Saint Vincent and the Grenadines.

Teams
Note: numbers of titles not fully known due to incomplete records. Tournaments from 2002 to 2005 included two possible titles, which are counted separately.

Results

See also
 Super50 Cup
 Twenty20 Blaze

References

Women's Super50 Cup
West Indian domestic cricket competitions
Women's cricket competitions in the West Indies
Recurring sporting events established in 1975
Limited overs cricket